Selections from Welcome Stranger  is an album of phonograph records by Bing Crosby of songs featured in his film Welcome Stranger. All of the songs were written by Jimmy Van Heusen (music) and Johnny Burke (lyrics).

Reception
Billboard magazine said Crosby "emphasises the hit quality of the score's ballad song, "As Long As I'm Dreaming". Other songs have only production value, Crosby singing it in easy and rhythmic style for "Smile Right Back at the Sun" and "My Heart Is a Hobo". And with the Calico Kids on the chant, Crosby is also the caller for the country style square dance ditty."

Down Beat was positive:
Better sides than Bing has made in a long while.  Sounds if he actually felt like singing. In 'Style' it's mostly his engaging half-singing manner that sneaks him through the by now apparent faults in his upper tones - and it's a square dance too.

Track listing
These songs were featured on a 2-disc, 78 rpm album set, Decca Album No. A-531.

References

Bing Crosby albums
1947 albums
Decca Records albums